Greg McLatchie is a consultant surgeon in Hartlepool NHS Trust and professor of sports medicine at the University of Sunderland. For five years he was director of the National Sports Medicine Institute. He is the author of several textbooks and scholarly articles on sports medicine and surgery, and a volume of poetry. In 2010 he chaired the International Sports Science and Sports Medicine conference in Newcastle upon Tyne

Books

Journal articles

References

Academics of the University of Sunderland
British sports physicians
Living people
Year of birth missing (living people)